Jose Luis Marcos León Perea (born 12 August 1947) is a Mexican politician from the Institutional Revolutionary Party. From 2009 to 2012 he served as Deputy of the LXI Legislature of the Mexican Congress representing Sonora.

References

1947 births
Living people
Politicians from Hidalgo (state)
Institutional Revolutionary Party politicians
21st-century Mexican politicians
National Autonomous University of Mexico alumni
Members of the Congress of Sonora
People from Tulancingo
Deputies of the LXI Legislature of Mexico
Members of the Chamber of Deputies (Mexico) for Sonora